PP-11 Rawalpindi-V is a Constituency of Provincial Assembly of Punjab.

2008-2013:PP-6 (Rawalpindi-VI)

2013-2018:PP-6 (Rawalpindi-VI)
General elections were held on 11 May 2013. Chaudhry Nisar Ali Khan won this seat with 51826 votes.

All candidates receiving over 1,000 votes are listed here.

2018—2023: PP-11 (Rawalpindi-VI)

General elections are scheduled to be held on 25 July 2018 Choudhry Muhammad Adnan won this seat with 42,892 votes.

See also
 PP-10 Rawalpindi-IV
 PP-12 Rawalpindi-VI

References

External links
 Election commission Pakistan's official website
 Awazoday.com check result
 Official Website of Government of Punjab

R